ChemComm (or Chemical Communications), formerly known as Journal of the Chemical Society D: Chemical Communications (1969–1971), Journal of the Chemical Society, Chemical Communications (1972–1995), is a peer-reviewed scientific journal published by the Royal Society of Chemistry. It covers all aspects of chemistry. In January 2012, the journal moved to publishing 100 issues per year. The current chair of the Editorial Board is Douglas Stephan (University of Toronto, Canada), while the executive editor is Richard Kelly.

Abstracting and indexing 
The journal is abstracted and indexed in:
 Chemical Abstracts
 Science Citation Index
 Current Contents/Physical, Chemical & Earth Sciences
 Scopus
 Index Medicus/MEDLINE/PubMed
According to the Journal Citation Reports, the journal has a 2021 impact factor of 6.065.

See also 
 New Journal of Chemistry
 Chemical Society Reviews
 Chemical Science
 RSC Advances

References

External links 
 

Chemistry journals
Journals more frequent than weekly
Royal Society of Chemistry academic journals
English-language journals
Publications established in 1965